This is a list of some equipment used by the Nigerian Army. Due to how large and secretive the Nigerian army is, it is currently impossible to calculate all weaponry in the army.

Infantry weapons

Missiles and recoilless rifles

Armoured fighting vehicles

Logistics

Engineering vehicles

Utility vehicle

Artillery

Air defence

Aircraft

References

Military equipment of Nigeria
Nigeria
Nigerian Army